Changlefang Subdistrict is a subdistrict of Beilin District, Xi'an.

References

Beilin District, Xi'an
Township-level divisions of Shaanxi